David Wilkinson (born 6 November 1973) is an Australian judoka. He competed in the men's middleweight event at the 1996 Summer Olympics.

References

External links
 

1973 births
Living people
Australian male judoka
Olympic judoka of Australia
Judoka at the 1996 Summer Olympics
Sportspeople from Brisbane